Salle des Sports is an indoor sporting arena located in Bourg-en-Bresse, France.  The capacity of the arena is 2,300 people.  It is currently home to the Jeunesse Laïque de Bourg-en-Bresse basketball team.

 means "hall", i.e., a sports hall, or indoor arena.

Indoor arenas in France
Basketball venues in France
Sports venues in Ain